The 1907 Tour de France was the 5th edition of Tour de France, one of cycling's Grand Tours. The Tour began in Paris on 8 July and Stage 8 occurred on 22 July with a flat stage from Nîmes. The race finished in Paris on 4 August.

Stage 8
22 July 1907 — Nîmes to Toulouse,

Stage 9
24 July 1907 — Toulouse to Bayonne,

Stage 10
26 July 1907 — Bayonne to Bordeaux,

Stage 11
28 July 1907 — Bordeaux to Nantes,

Stage 12
30 July 1907 — Nantes to Brest,

Stage 13
1 August 1907 — Brest to Caen,

Stage 14
4 August 1907 — Caen to Paris,

References

1907 Tour de France
Tour de France stages